Tinissa conchata is a moth of the family Tineidae. It is found in China (Fujian, Guangdong and Guangxi).

The wingspan is 16−20 mm for males and about 22 mm for females. The forewings have a yellowish white to yellowish brown ground color, with a bluish violet sheen and scattered inconspicuous, transverse, fine grayish brown striae. The hindwings are pale grayish brown, shining bluish violet.

Etymology
The specific name is derived from the Latin conchatus (meaning conchoidal) and refers to the scallop-shaped distal half of the juxta.

References

Moths described in 2012
Scardiinae